Ali Salman is a Pakistani politician who was a Member of the Provincial Assembly of the Punjab, from May 2013 to May 2018.

Early life and education
He was born on 4 September 1975 in Lahore.

He has a degree of Bachelor of Arts (Hons) in Economics and Development studies which he received in 1999 from University of Sussex and has a degree  of Master of Laws in Law and Development which he obtained in 2001 from University of Warwick.

Political career

He was elected to the Provincial Assembly of the Punjab as an independent candidate from Constituency PP-168 (Sheikhupura-Cum-Nanakana Sahib-I) in 2013 Pakistani general election.

References

Living people
Punjab MPAs 2013–2018
1975 births